Every Toyota vehicle has a model code which describes the basic vehicle (e.g. Corolla), its generation and major options (engine type, gearbox type, body style, grade level). The model codes fall into three periods, 1937 to late 1950s, late 1950s to late 1970s and late 1970s to present. There was some overlap as new models were phased in using new codes while old models were phased out using the old codes. The model code is not the same as the VIN.

1937 to 1956
Each model was known by its engine code and a single letter for the chassis/body.

Examples:

1956 to 1977
Each model was known by its engine code, chassis code, one or two digits for its generation, a single digit for variations within the generation and more letters representing options.

Engine family:

Platform:

Steering:

Options:

1977 to present
The new code was similar to the previous but now the options were grouped into specific columns.

Engine family:

Platform and model name:

Steering:

Wagon:

Model name:

Body type:

Transmission:

Grade:

Engine class:

Destination :

See also
 List of Toyota model codes

References

Toyota